Harald Johnsson  (1898–1987) was a Swedish politician. He was a member of the Centre Party.

References
This article was initially translated from the Swedish Wikipedia article.

Centre Party (Sweden) politicians
1898 births
1987 deaths
20th-century Swedish politicians